Wayne Jackson may refer to:

Wayne Jackson (brigadier), senior Australian army officer
Wayne Jackson (footballer) (born 1944), Australian football player and former CEO of the Australian Football League
Wayne Jackson (musician) (1941–2016), trumpet player and member of the Memphis Horns
Wayne Jackson (singer) (born 1971), British pop singer
Bishop Wayne T. Jackson, Great Faith Ministries International